Aytaç Ak (born 22 April 1985) is a Turkish former professional footballer who played as a centre-back.

References

External links
 
 

1985 births
Living people
Sportspeople from Adapazarı
MKE Ankaragücü footballers
Turanspor footballers
Malatyaspor footballers
Sakaryaspor footballers
Turkish footballers
Sivasspor footballers
Süper Lig players
Diyarbakırspor footballers
Tarsus Idman Yurdu footballers
Turkey youth international footballers
1461 Trabzon footballers
TFF First League players
Association football defenders